is a member of the Supreme Court of Japan.

References

Supreme Court of Japan justices
1945 births
Living people